Birendra (1945 – 2001) was king of Nepal from 1972 until 2001.

Birendra may also refer to:

People 
 Birendra Nath Mallick, Indian neurobiologist
 Birendranath Sircar, Indian film producer
 Birendra Bijoy Biswas, Indian molecular biologist and geneticist
 Birendra Krishna Bhadra, Indian radio broadcaster, playwright, actor, narrator and theatre director
 Birendra Nath Datta, Indian academician, linguist, researcher of folklore, singer and lyricist
 Birendra Kumar Bhattacharya, Indian writer
 Birendra Shah, Nepalese journalist
 Birendranath Sasmal, Indian politician and lawyer
 Birendra Kishore Manikya, throne of the Kingdom of Tripura
 Birendra Lakra, Indian professional field hockey player
 Birendra Singh Rana, Indian politician
 Birendra Kumar Chaudhary, Indian politician

Others 
 Birendra Sainik Awasiya Mahavidyalaya, military boarding high school in Nepal
 Birendranagar, city in Karnali province of Nepal

Indian masculine given names
Nepalese masculine given names